Out Cold is the fifth studio and second holiday album by the a cappella group Rockapella. ForLife Records wanted the group to do a second Christmas album, but settled for a mixture of Christmas and non-holiday music. This combination has led it to be described as the "winter romance" album.

Track listing

Personnel
Scott Leonard – high tenor
Sean Altman – tenor
Elliot Kerman – baritone
Barry Carl – bass
Jeff Thacher - vocal percussion

Special appearances
Jesse Leonard – "I Know Christmas"

References

1990 albums
Rockapella albums